Hymenobacter perfusus  is a bacterium of the genus Hymenobacter which has been isolated from a uranium mine waste water treatment system.

References

External links
Type strain of Hymenobacter perfusus at BacDive -  the Bacterial Diversity Metadatabase

perfusus
Bacteria described in 2011